The Tiger Rising is a 2022 American drama film written and directed by Ray Giarratana and starring Christian Convery, Madalen Mills, Katharine McPhee, Sam Trammell, Dennis Quaid and Queen Latifah. It is based on the 2001 book of the same name by Kate DiCamillo.

Plot
A young boy finds a tiger caged in the woods near where he lives. Together, they plan to head toward its home-to-be.

Cast
Christian Convery as Rob Horton
Dennis Quaid as Beauchamp
Queen Latifah as Willie May
Madalen Mills as Sistine Bailey
Katharine McPhee as Caroline Horton
Sam Trammell as Rob Horton Sr.
Nicholas Ryan Hernandez as Billy Threemonger
Jayden Fontaine as Norton Threemonger
Angela Giarratana as Miss Mills

Production
Principal photography occurred in Tifton, Georgia and Thomasville, Georgia in November 2019.  Filming wrapped in December 2019.

Controversy
On November 18, 2021, The Hollywood Reporter published an article about Ryan Donnell Smith, Allen Cheney, Emily Hunter Salveson and Ryan Winterstern not paying crew members before or after filming the movie.

Release
The film was released in theaters on January 21, 2022 and on Demand and Digital February 8, 2022.

Box office
In South Africa, the film earned $16,541 from 59 theaters in its opening weekend. In the United States and Canada, the film earned $364,216 from 872 theaters in its first weekend, and $214,980 in its second.

Reception
The film has a 17% approval rating on Rotten Tomatoes based on 18 reviews, with an average rating of 4.2/10. On Metacritic — which assigns a weighted mean score — the film has a score of 33 out of 100 based on 6 critics, indicating "generally unfavorable reviews".

Nick Schager of Variety gave the film a negative review and wrote, "The fact that writer-director Ray Giarratana’s film is based on Kate DiCamillo’s children’s book — and thus intended for young audiences — is hardly an excuse for such stodgy storytelling, which plays out with no mystery, ambiguity or subtlety."

Nadir Samara of Screen Rant awarded the film one star out of five and wrote, "The Tiger Rising is too serious & abstract for kids yet too ham-fisted for adults. Sadly, the tale has none of the imagination its protagonist does."

References

External links
 

American children's drama films
Films based on American novels
Films based on children's books
Films about tigers
Films set in Florida
Films shot in Georgia (U.S. state)
2020s English-language films
2020s American films